Vitomirești is a commune in Olt County, Muntenia, Romania. It is composed of six villages: Bulimanu, Dejești, Donești, Stănuleasa, Trepteni and Vitomirești.

References

Communes in Olt County
Localities in Muntenia